This page lists albums, singles, and compilations by the musician Joe Jackson. Jackson's recording career as a solo artist began in 1979, with the release of his debut album Look Sharp!. The album was recorded with the Joe Jackson Band, with whom he would release two more albums, I'm the Man and Beat Crazy, the latter of which was credited to the full band rather than simply Jackson.

Following Beat Crazy, Jackson broke up with his backing band and recorded a series of albums, ranging from cover albums (1981's Jumpin' Jive) to original studio albums (1982's Night and Day) and live albums (1986's Big World, an album of original material recorded live). He has also experimented with movie soundtracks and classical music. He reunited with the Joe Jackson Band for 2003's Volume 4 and has since recorded several more solo albums, the most recent being Fool (2019).

Albums

Studio albums

Live albums

Soundtrack albums

Compilation albums

Box sets

Video albums

Singles

Other singles

Notes

References

Rock music discographies
Discographies of British artists
New wave discographies